Lingyuan may refer to:

Lingyuan, Liaoning, city in Liaoning, China
Lingyuan Subdistrict, in Jinjiang, Fujiang, China
Chu Lingyuan (褚靈媛) (384–436), last empress of Jin Dynasty in China
Lingyuan, Wenquan, Yingshan County, Huanggang, Hubei